JNJ-39393406 is an experimental medication which is under development by Janssen Pharmaceutica, a division of Johnson & Johnson, for the treatment of depressive disorders and smoking withdrawal. It acts as a selective positive allosteric modulator of the α7 nicotinic acetylcholine receptor (nAChR). It does not act on the α4β2 or α3β4 nAChRs or the serotonin 5-HT3 receptor, and does not interact with a panel of 62 other receptors and enzymes. The drug has been found to lower the agonist and nicotine threshold for activation of the α7 nAChR by 10- to 20-fold and to increase the maximum agonist response of the α7 nAChR by 17- to 20-fold. 

As of February 2018, JNJ-39393406 is in phase II clinical trials for both depressive disorders and smoking withdrawal. It was also under investigation for the treatment of schizophrenia and Alzheimer's disease, but development for these indications was discontinued.

See also
 List of investigational antidepressants

References

Amines
Antidepressants
Benzodioxoles
Experimental drugs
Fluoroarenes
Nicotinic antagonists
Nootropics
Propionamides
4-Pyridyl compounds
Smoking cessation
Triazoles